A list of films produced in the Cinema of Mexico ordered by year of release in the 1970s.  For an alphabetical list of articles on Mexican films see :Category:Mexican films.

1970
 List of Mexican films of 1970

1971
 List of Mexican films of 1971

1972
 List of Mexican films of 1972

1973
 List of Mexican films of 1973

1974
 List of Mexican films of 1974

1975
 List of Mexican films of 1975

1976
 List of Mexican films of 1976

1977
 List of Mexican films of 1977

1978
 List of Mexican films of 1978

1979
 List of Mexican films of 1979

External links
 Mexican film at the Internet Movie Database

Mexican
Films

fr:Liste de films mexicains
zh:墨西哥電影列表